Tân Hải may refer to several places in Vietnam:

Tân Hải, Bình Thuận, a commune of La Gi
Tân Hải, Bà Rịa-Vũng Tàu, a commune of Phú Mỹ
Tân Hải, Ninh Thuận, a commune of Ninh Hải District
Tân Hải, Cà Mau, a commune of Phú Tân District, Cà Mau Province